The 1921–22 Yorkshire Football League was the 2nd season in the history of the Yorkshire Football League.

Clubs

The league featured 9 new teams:
 Brodsworth Main, new entrant joined from Doncaster & District League
 Castleford Town reserves, new entrant
 Doncaster Rovers reserves, new entrant
 Halifax Town reserves, new entrant
 Harrogate reserves, new entrant
 Houghton Main, new entrant
 Wakefield City reserves, new entrant
 Wath Athletic reserves, new entrant
 Wombwell reserves, new entrant

Also Goole Shipyards became Hook Shipyards.

Map

League table

References

1921–22 in English football leagues
Yorkshire Football League